Chloroclystis tortuosa is a moth in the family Geometridae. It is found on the Philippines (Luzon).

References

External links
 
 

Moths described in 1929
tortuosa